Justice McDonald or MacDonald may refer to:

Andrew J. McDonald (b. 1966), associate justice of the Connecticut Supreme Court
Charles James McDonald (1793-1860), associate justice of the Supreme Court of Georgia
Francis M. McDonald Jr. (born 1931), associate justice of the Connecticut Supreme Court
Gordon J. MacDonald (born 1961), chief justice of the New Hampshire Supreme Court
J. Michael MacDonald (fl. 1970s–2020s), chief justice of Nova Scotia
John S. McDonald (1864–1941), associate justice of the Michigan Supreme Court
Malcolm Archibald Macdonald (1875–1941), chief justice of British Columbia
Parker Lee McDonald (1924-2017), associate justice of the Florida Supreme Court
Robert N. McDonald (b. 1952), judge of the Maryland Court of Appeals

See also
 Macdonald (disambiguation)